Mark Griskey (born 1963) is an American composer for video games such as Marvel Heroes, Star Wars: Knights of the Old Republic II: The Sith Lords, and Star Wars: The Old Republic as well as several titles for Disney Publishing Worldwide.

Early career
Griskey started his career in the early 1990s, composing music for movie trailers and TV promo commercials. In the mid-90s, he stepped into interactive media, composing for Atom Entertainment.

LucasArts career
In 2001, Griskey started scoring video games for LucasArts, including Star Wars: Jedi Starfighter and Gladius.  He composed some of the tracks on "The Best of LucasArts Original Soundtrack," which was named "Best Game Music Soundtrack Album of the Year" by the Game Audio Network Guild. His latest projects for the LucasArts company are Star Wars: The Force Unleashed II, which was released on 26 October 2010, and the MMORPG, Star Wars: The Old Republic, which was released on December 20, 2011.

After LucasArts and recent projects
In March 2005, Griskey left LucasArts to start his freelance career with a game from Disney Interactive Studios: The Chronicles of Narnia: The Lion, the Witch and the Wardrobe. The score for Narnia was well received, and led to two additional game contracts with Disney; Pirates of the Caribbean: At World's End (2007), and The Chronicles of Narnia: Prince Caspian (2008). In addition to Griskey's work with Disney, he has also scored several other games for various publishers including: Rayman Raving Rabbids 1, 2 and TV Party; Ubisoft, Iron Man and The Incredible Hulk; Sega and Marvel Ultimate Alliance; Activision.  In 2007, he composed the trailer music for Harry Potter and the Order of the Phoenix, and was also contracted to compose the score for LucasArts' title, Star Wars: The Force Unleashed, in late 2007 and later the MMO, The Old Republic.

Awards

List of Mark's awards and nominations from the Game Audio Network Guild:

References

External links
 Official Site
 

1963 births
21st-century American composers
American male composers
Living people
Video game composers
21st-century American male musicians